Ardak is a city in Qazvin Province, Iran.

Ardak may also refer to:
 Ardak (village), in Qazvin County, Qazvin Province, Iran
 Ardak, Razavi Khorasan
 Ardak, Gonabad, Razavi Khorasan Province